During the 2001–02 Dutch football season, AFC Ajax competed in the Eredivisie.

Season summary
Manager Co Adriaanse was sacked in late November after some poor results, including elimination from the Champions League and UEFA Cup. His replacement, Ronald Koeman, led Ajax to the league and cup double.

Players

First-team squad
Squad at end of season

Left club during season

Jong Ajax

Results

UEFA Champions League

Third qualifying round
 15 August: Ajax 1-3 Celtic (Arveladze; Petta, Agathe, Sutton)
 29 August: Celtic 0-1 Ajax

UEFA Cup

First round
 Ajax 3–0 Apollon Limassol
 Apollon Limassol 0-2 Ajax

Second round
 Copenhagen 0–0 Ajax
 Ajax 0-1 Copenhagen

References

Notes

AFC Ajax seasons
AFC Ajax
Dutch football championship-winning seasons